Ununennium (119Uue) has not yet been synthesised, so all data would be theoretical and a standard atomic weight cannot be given. Like all synthetic elements, it would have no stable isotopes.

List of isotopes 
No isotopes of ununennium are known.

Nucleosynthesis

Target-projectile combinations leading to Z=119 compound nuclei
The below table contains various combinations of targets and projectiles that could be used to form compound nuclei with Z=119.

Cold fusion
Following the claimed synthesis of 293Og in 1999 at the Lawrence Berkeley National Laboratory from 208Pb and 86Kr, the analogous reactions 209Bi + 86Kr and 208Pb + 87Rb were proposed for the synthesis of element 119 and its then-unknown alpha decay daughters, elements 117, 115, and 113. The retraction of these results in 2001 and more recent calculations on the cross sections for "cold" fusion reactions cast doubt on this possibility; for example, a maximum yield of 2 fb is predicted for the production of 294Uue in the former reaction. Radioactive ion beams may provide an alternative method utilizing a lead or bismuth target, and may enable the production of more neutron-rich isotopes should they become available at required intensities.

Hot fusion

248Cm(51V,xn)299-xUue
The team at RIKEN in Wakō, Japan began bombarding curium-248 targets with a vanadium-51 beam in January 2018 to search for element 119. Curium was chosen as a target, rather than heavier berkelium or californium, as these heavier targets are difficult to prepare. The reduced asymmetry of the reaction is expected to approximately halve the cross section, requiring a sensitivity "on the order of at least 30 fb". The 248Cm targets were provided by Oak Ridge National Laboratory. RIKEN developed a high-intensity vanadium beam. The experiment began at a cyclotron while RIKEN upgraded its linear accelerators; the upgrade was completed in 2020. Bombardment may be continued with both machines until the first event is observed; the experiment is currently running intermittently for at least 100 days per year. The RIKEN team's efforts are being financed by the Emperor of Japan.

 +  → * → no atoms yet

The produced isotopes of ununennium are expected to undergo two alpha decays to known isotopes of moscovium (288Mc and 287Mc respectively), which would anchor them to a known sequence of five further alpha decays and corroborate their production. The cross section is probably below 10 fb.

249Bk(50Ti,xn)299-xUue
From April to September 2012, an attempt to synthesize the isotopes 295Uue and 296Uue was made by bombarding a target of berkelium-249 with titanium-50 at the GSI Helmholtz Centre for Heavy Ion Research in Darmstadt, Germany. This reaction between 249Bk and 50Ti was predicted to be the most favorable practical reaction for formation of ununennium, as it is rather asymmetrical, though also somewhat cold. (The reaction between 254Es and 48Ca would be superior, but preparing milligram quantities of 254Es for a target is difficult.) Moreover, as berkelium-249 decays to californium-249 (the next element) with a short half-life of 327 days, this allowed elements 119 and 120 to be searched for simultaneously. Nevertheless, the necessary change from the "silver bullet" 48Ca to 50Ti divides the expected yield of ununennium by about twenty, as the yield is strongly dependent on the asymmetry of the fusion reaction. Due to the predicted short half-lives, the GSI team used new "fast" electronics capable of registering decay events within microseconds.
 +  → * → no atoms
 +  → * → no atoms
Neither element 119 nor element 120 was observed. This implied a limiting cross-section of 65 fb for producing element 119 in these reactions, and 200 fb for element 120. The predicted actual cross section for producing element 119 in this reaction is around 40 fb, which is at the limits of current technology. (The record lowest cross section of an experimentally successful reaction is 30 fb for the reaction between 209Bi and 70Zn producing nihonium.) The experiment was originally planned to continue to November 2012, but was stopped early to make use of the 249Bk target to confirm the synthesis of tennessine (thus changing the projectiles to 48Ca).

The team at the Joint Institute for Nuclear Research in Dubna, Russia, planned to attempt this reaction. Currently, beams heavier than 48Ca have not been used at the JINR, but they are actively being developed.

254Es(48Ca,xn)302-xUue
The synthesis of ununennium was first attempted in 1985 by bombarding a sub-microgram target of einsteinium-254 with calcium-48 ions at the superHILAC accelerator at Berkeley, California:
 +  → * → no atoms
No atoms were identified, leading to a limiting cross section of 300 nb. Later calculations suggest that the cross section of the 3n reaction (which would result in 299Uue and three neutrons as products) would actually be six hundred thousand times lower than this upper bound, at 0.5 pb.

References 
 Isotope masses from:

 
Ununennium
ununennium